George C. Blankley (October 7, 1918 – December 29, 2016) was an American football and basketball coach and college athletics administrator.  He served as the head basketball coach at Boise Junior College—now Boise State University—from 1948 to 1962, compiling a record of 206–139.  Blankey was also the head football coach at Boise Junior College from the middle of the 1950 season through the 1951 season, assuming the responsibility after Coach Lyle Smith was called into the United States Navy during the early part of the Korean War. Blankley compiled a record of 16–2 as head football coach of BJC. In 1962 was hired as athletic director and head football coach at General Beadle State College—now known as Dakota State University—in Madison, South Dakota.  He resigned as head football coach following the 1969 season, compiling a record of 27–39–1 in eight seasons.

Blankley was born in Curwensville, Pennsylvania, and grew up playing football, basketball, and baseball.  He attended the College of Idaho, where he played football, as an end, and baseball.  Blankey graduated from college in 1941.  He played minor league baseball with the Boise Pilots of the Pioneer Baseball League that year before becoming the athletic director and coach at Kuna High School.  From 1943 to 1945, he taught physical education at his alma mater and then served as a physical trainer in the United States Marines.  In 1948, Blankley was coaching basketball at Caldwell High School in Caldwell, Idaho.

Head coaching record

Junior college football

College football

References

1918 births
2016 deaths
American football ends
Basketball coaches from Pennsylvania
Boise State Broncos football coaches
Boise State Broncos men's basketball coaches
Boise Pilots players
College of Idaho Coyotes baseball players
College of Idaho Coyotes football players
Dakota State Trojans athletic directors
Dakota State Trojans football coaches
High school basketball coaches in Idaho
People from Connellsville, Pennsylvania
People from Caldwell, Idaho
Players of American football from Pennsylvania
Sportspeople from the Pittsburgh metropolitan area
United States Marine Corps personnel of World War II